Japanese boy band Sexy Zone has released eight studio albums, two compilation albums, 22 singles, and 15 concert videos. Sexy Zone has also released 34 music videos.

Albums

Studio albums

Compilation albums

Singles

Videography

Concert videos 

Notes

Music videos

References

External links
 

Discographies of Japanese artists
Johnny & Associates
Pony Canyon artists
Pop music group discographies